Mount Royal is an unincorporated community in York County, Pennsylvania, United States. Mount Royal is located on Pennsylvania Route 74 about 3 miles north of Dover.

References

Unincorporated communities in York County, Pennsylvania
Unincorporated communities in Pennsylvania